"Without You" is a song by Swedish DJ Avicii, featuring vocals from Swedish singer Sandro Cavazza. The song was released on 11 August 2017 as the lead single from Avicii's EP, Avīci (01). "Without You" is Avicii's seventh Swedish number-one single, reaching number one upon release in 2017 and again after Avicii's death in April 2018.

On 13 October 2017, the official remix EP was released, featuring remixes from Otto Knows, Merk & Kremont, Rob Adans and the winners of his remix contest, Notre Dame and Tokima Tokio.

The song was used in the trailers and ad campaign for the 2020 animated movie Scoob!

Sarah Dawn Finer released a cover of the song on 4 February 2021.

Background and reception
"Without You" was the opening track in Avicii's Ultra Miami set in March 2016. The song was used frequently across the world throughout 2016. A fan made video of the song was available online from September 2016. The song was released digitally on 11 August 2017.

Jeffrey Yau of Your EDM said, "'Without You' is quintessential Avicii. Smooth, upbeat melodies marked with heavy string usage and a euphoric progressive house drop perfectly crafted for the mainstage. Simple, happy-go-lucky lyrics and chord progressions that will have you smiling from the first second to the last – this is Avicii at his finest."

Track listing
Digital download – remixes
 "Without You" (Otto Knows Remix) – 3:33
 "Without You" (Merk & Kremont Remix) – 4:20
 "Without You" (Notre Dame Remix) – 4:05
 "Without You" (Tokima Tokyo Remix) – 3:11
 "Without You" (Rob Adans Remix) – 3:04
 "Without You" (Adans Remix) – 4:17
 "Without You (Avicii By Avicii) - 2:15

Charts

Weekly charts

Year-end charts

Certifications

See also
 List of number-one singles of the 2010s (Sweden)

References

External links
 
 

2017 singles
2016 songs
Avicii songs
Sandro Cavazza songs
Number-one singles in Sweden
Number-one singles in Finland
Number-one singles in New Zealand
Song recordings produced by Avicii
Songs written by Avicii
Songs written by Carl Falk
Songs written by Vincent Pontare
Songs written by Salem Al Fakir
Songs written by Sandro Cavazza